The Granville Theatre complex is located in Victoria Parade, Ramsgate, Kent, and is the town's sole multi-purpose entertainment venue. The theatre derived its name from the Granville Hotel, Ramsgate opposite. The building is currently leased from Thanet District Council.

The old Granville Pavilion was damaged beyond repair in WW2 and was subsequently demolished.  A new building was planned on the same site by the Borough Engineer (Mr R. D. Brimmell).  The New Granville Theatre, as it was originally known, was designed by the architect Mr W. Garwood at a cost of £13,100.  After the war, building materials were in short supply.  This meant that every usable brick from the old building was brought into use, with new blocks being made in the town.  The theatre was declared open by the Mayor of Ramsgate (Alderman S. E. Austin) on Saturday 21 June 1947.  

The Granville Theatre has two large cinema screens, Dolby Surround Sound, lounge seats and free parking.  The main cinema has a large flat performance space that is used for small-scale performances, conferences and functions.  The second screen auditorium has a fully equipped 30 ft stage, used regularly for visiting professional, local amateur and in-house theatre productions.
The complex also has a separate dance studio, theatre bar and facilities for the disabled.

The Granville Theatre's Patron is the celebrated and award-winning actress Brenda Blethyn.

The theatre and cinema closed in March 2020 as a result of the COVID-19 pandemic and was put up for sale in May 2022.

References

External links 
Granville Theatre website
Theatres Trust Database: Granville

Theatres in Kent
Cinemas in Kent
Ramsgate